Yakabuski is a surname. Notable people with the surname include:

John Yakabuski (born 1957), Canadian politician
Paul Yakabuski (1922–1987), Canadian politician